Pam: Girl on the Loose! is an American documentary series that debuted on E! on August 3, 2008. The program documented the daily life of Canadian-born American actress, producer, model, activist, Playboy Playmate and sex symbol Pamela Anderson, her family, and her friends, as she offers a real raw glimpse into her private life that the public and the tabloids don't get a look at.

Critical reception
The New York Daily News gave it 2 stars and added, "Mainly, it's just another low-rent celebrity show along the lines of Keeping Up with the Kardashians - typical for a genre these days that asks very little of celebrity subjects in exchange for getting them on the air."

Note the Los Angeles Times' Mary McNamara: "Age may have prompted her to prove there is a person underneath all that hair, behind all that décolletage, but it's a crowded genre, honey, and Girl on the Loose seems just a little too little too late."

Episodes

References

External links
 

2000s American reality television series
2008 American television series debuts
2008 American television series endings
E! original programming
English-language television shows
Television shows set in Los Angeles
Television shows set in Queensland